"Nothin' but Cowboy Boots" is a song recorded by American country music duo Blue County.  It was released in December 2004 as the third single from the album Blue County.  The song reached #38 on the Billboard Hot Country Singles & Tracks chart.  The song was written by Aaron Benward and Lee Thomas Miller.

Chart performance

References

2004 singles
2004 songs
Blue County (duo) songs
Songs written by Lee Thomas Miller
Song recordings produced by Dann Huff
Song recordings produced by Doug Johnson (record producer)
Curb Records singles
Songs written by Aaron Benward